Topister Nafula Situma (born 9 October 1992) is a Kenyan footballer who plays as a forward for Tanzanian club Simba Queens and the Kenya women's national team.

International career
Situma capped for Kenya at senior level during the 2020 Turkish Women's Cup.

See also
List of Kenya women's international footballers

References

External links

Living people
People from Bungoma County
Kenyan women's footballers
Women's association football forwards
Kenya women's international footballers
1992 births